The Meeting Hall is a building at 1st North and 3rd East in Beaver, Utah that was built in 1909.  It was property of the Beaver Relief Society.

It was listed on the National Register of Historic Places in 1982.  At the time of its listing it was "in great need of maintenance" yet "still very interesting":  it is a brick building with unusual-for-Beaver Flemish bond pattern, and has other unusual characteristics, according to its historic site nomination.

This building is different from the Beaver Relief Society Meetinghouse, located nearby at 35 N. 1st East.  That building is also NRHP-listed and currently serves as the town's firehouse.

References

Churches on the National Register of Historic Places in Utah
Buildings and structures completed in 1909
Buildings and structures in Beaver County, Utah
National Register of Historic Places in Beaver County, Utah
20th-century Latter Day Saint church buildings
Relief Society buildings